Solar power in Japan has been expanding since the late 1990s. 
The country is a major manufacturer and exporter of photovoltaics (PV) and a large installer of domestic PV systems, with most of them grid connected. 
Japan has a solar irradiance of about 4.3 to 4.8 kWh/(m2·day).

Solar power has become an important national priority since the country's shift in policies toward renewable energy after the Fukushima Daiichi nuclear disaster in 2011.
Japan was the world's second largest market for solar PV growth in 2013 and 2014, adding a record 6.97 GW and 9.74 GW of nominal nameplate capacity, respectively. 
By the end of 2017, cumulative capacity reached 50 GW, the world's second largest solar PV installed capacity, behind China.
Overall installed capacity in 2016 was estimated to be sufficient to supply almost 5% of the nation's annual electricity demand.

Solar manufacturing industry

Japanese manufacturers and exporters of photovoltaics include Kyocera, Mitsubishi Electric, Mitsubishi Heavy Industries, Sanyo, Sharp Solar, Solar Frontier, and Toshiba.

Government action

Feed-in tariff
The Japanese government is seeking to expand solar power by enacting subsidies and a feed-in tariff (FIT). In December 2008, the Ministry of Economy, Trade and Industry announced a goal of 70% of new homes having solar power installed, and would be spending $145 million in the first quarter of 2009 to encourage home solar power. The government enacted a feed-in tariff on November, 2009 that requires utilities to purchase excess solar power sent to the grid by homes and businesses and pay twice the standard electricity rate for that power.

On June 18, 2012, a new feed-in tariff was approved, of 42 Yen/kWh. The tariff covers the first ten years of excess generation for systems less than 10 kW, and generation for twenty years for systems over 10 kW. It became effective July 1, 2012.
In April 2013, the FIT was reduced to 37.8 Yen/kWh. The FIT was further reduced to 32 Yen/kWh in April 2014.

In March 2016, a new feed-in tariff was approved.
The Procurement Price Calculation Committee compiled and publicized recommendations concerning the FY 2016 purchase prices and the periods therefor. Respecting the recommendations, METI finalized the prices and periods therefor as below.

(1) Electricity generated by photovoltaic power for non-household customers (10 kW or more) was reduced from 27 yen/kWh to 24 yen/kWh.

(2) Electricity generated by photovoltaic power for household customers (10 kW or less) was reduced from 33 yen/kWh to 31 yen/kWh when generators are not required to have output control equipment installed. When generators are required to have output control equipment installed the price was reduced from 35 yen/kWh to 33 yen/kWh.

Residential PV feed-in tariffs for systems below 10 kW were updated in 2017 to values between JPY24/kWh to JPY28/kWh depending on the circumstances. These will remain unchanged until 2019.

The most recent FIT only concerns non-residential solar power plants. 
The new non-residential FIT will go from JPY21/kWh in 2017 to JPY18/kWh for facilities certified in and after April 2018.

Targets
The government set solar PV targets in 2004 and revised them in 2009:

 28 GW of solar PV capacity by 2020
 53 GW of solar PV capacity by 2030
 10% of total domestic primary energy demand met with solar PV by 2050

The targets set for 2020 were surpassed in 2014, and the target for 2030 was surpassed in 2018.

As of July 2021, Japan was aiming at 108 GW of solar capacity by 2030. In May 2021, the Japanese Trade Ministry said that Japan may require up to 370 GW of solar capacity by 2050 to reach the goal of cutting carbon emissions to zero.

Photovoltaics installed capacity and generation

See also
Energy in Japan
Japanese reaction to Fukushima Daiichi nuclear disaster
List of renewable energy topics by country and territory
Solar power by country

References

External links

  (Japan Photovoltaic Energy Association, JPEA)
 Electrical Japan: Google Maps of Power Stations (Solar)  
 Tepco real time monitor

 
Japan